{{DISPLAYTITLE:C21H29NO3}}
The molecular formula C21H29NO3 (molar mass: 343.46 g/mol, exact mass: 343.2147 u) may refer to:

 CAR-226,086
 CAR-301,060
 25iP-NBOMe
 25P-NBOMe

Molecular formulas